Guangzhou Martyrs' Memorial Garden is a park located in  Zhongshan 3rd Road, Guangzhou, Guangdong, China that commemorates the death of the Chinese Communist party in the Guangzhou Uprising against the Kuomintang on December 11, 1927.

History
Construction of the park started in 1954 and finished in 1957 to commemorate the 30th anniversary of the Guangzhou Uprising. The door on the stone wall was engraved with the text "Guangzhou uprising martyrs cemetery" by China's first prime minister Zhou Enlai.

There is currently a station for the Guangzhou Metro Line 1 in front of the park.

Gallery

References

Buildings and structures in Guangzhou
Yuexiu District